Asker Municipality, informally referred to as Greater Asker, is a municipality in Viken county, Norway, that was established in 2020 by the merger of Asker in Akershus and Røyken and Hurum in Buskerud. Asker proper (also called Askerbygda) constitutes the northern fourth of the municipality, while Røyken and Hurum constitute the southern three quarters. It is part of the Greater Oslo Region. The administrative centre of the municipality is the town of Asker.

Notable people

References

External links

Municipalities of Viken (county)
Asker